Pedro Gustavo Cabrera Rivero (born 22 December 1962) is a Mexican politician affiliated with the Institutional Revolutionary Party. As of 2014 he served as Deputy of the LIX Legislature of the Mexican Congress representing Oaxaca as replacement of Gonzalo Ruiz Cerón.

References

1962 births
Living people
Politicians from Oaxaca
Institutional Revolutionary Party politicians
Deputies of the LIX Legislature of Mexico
Members of the Chamber of Deputies (Mexico) for Oaxaca